Crest is an unincorporated community in San Diego County, California. The Crest census-designated place (CDP) had a population of 2,593 at the 2010 census, down from 2,716 at the 2000 census.

Geography
Crest is located on a hill east of El Cajon. According to the USGS it is located at  (32.8072739 -116.8680800). According to the United States Census Bureau Crest is located at  (32.805918, -116.867405), approximately 500 feet to the southeast of the USGS location. Mail sent to Crest is addressed to El Cajon, California.

Demographics

2010
At the 2010 census Crest had a population of 2,593. The racial makeup of Crest was 2,329 (89.8%) White, 23 (0.9%) African American, 21 (0.8%) Native American, 38 (1.5%) Asian, 7 (0.3%) Pacific Islander, 90 (3.5%) from other races, and 85 (3.3%) from two or more races. Hispanic or Latino of any race were 319 people (12.3%).

The whole population lived in households, no one lived in non-institutionalized group quarters and no one was institutionalized.

There were 962 households, 291 (30.2%) had children under the age of 18 living in them, 576 (59.9%) were opposite-sex married couples living together, 93 (9.7%) had a female householder with no husband present, 51 (5.3%) had a male householder with no wife present.  There were 39 (4.1%) unmarried opposite-sex partnerships, and 7 (0.7%) same-sex married couples or partnerships. 179 households (18.6%) were one person and 61 (6.3%) had someone living alone who was 65 or older. The average household size was 2.70.  There were 720 families (74.8% of households); the average family size was 3.04.

The age distribution was 496 people (19.1%) under the age of 18, 257 people (9.9%) aged 18 to 24, 551 people (21.2%) aged 25 to 44, 964 people (37.2%) aged 45 to 64, and 325 people (12.5%) who were 65 or older.  The median age was 44.8 years. For every 100 females, there were 105.0 males.  For every 100 females age 18 and over, there were 101.6 males.

There were 997 housing units at an average density of 152.7 per square mile, of the occupied units 808 (84.0%) were owner-occupied and 154 (16.0%) were rented. The homeowner vacancy rate was 1.0%; the rental vacancy rate was 4.9%.  2,181 people (84.1% of the population) lived in owner-occupied housing units and 412 people (15.9%) lived in rental housing units.

2000
At the 2000 census there were 2,716 people, 964 households, and 746 families in the CDP. The population density was 425.4 inhabitants per square mile (164.4/km). The racial makeup of the CDP was 92.89% White, 0.33% African American, 0.81% Native American, 0.70% Asian, 0.26% Pacific Islander, 1.88% from other races, and 3.13% from two or more races. Hispanic or Latino of any race were 7.84%.

Of the 964 households 36.5% had children under the age of 18 living with them, 63.3% were married couples living together, 9.2% had a female householder with no husband present, and 22.6% were non-families. 16.7% of households were one person and 4.3% were one person aged 65 or older.  The average household size was 2.79 and the average family size was 3.12.

The age distribution was 26.7% under the age of 18, 6.6% from 18 to 24, 27.2% from 25 to 44, 29.7% from 45 to 64, and 9.8% 65 or older.  The median age was 40 years. For every 100 females, there were 102.1 males.  For every 100 females age 18 and over, there were 102.7 males.

The median household income was $56,728 and the median family income  was $60,852. Males had a median income of $50,293 versus $35,610 for females. The per capita income for the CDP was $22,890.  About 5.2% of families and 9.1% of the population were below the poverty line, including 10.2% of those under age 18 and 4.4% of those age 65 or over.

Crest has 3 churches (two Protestant and one Catholic), a library, an elementary school, a taco shop, and two convenience stores.

History
The name Crest is the result of the combination of the previously named La Cresta (in the northern part of the community), and Suncrest (in the southern part of the community).  
Crest was twice devastated by wildfires: first by the Laguna Fire in 1970 then again by the Cedar Fire in 2003.

Gregory Peck once owned a summer home in Crest.

Government

References

External links
http://www.thecrestsun.com/

Census-designated places in San Diego County, California
East County (San Diego County)
Census-designated places in California